DeWitt County is the name of two counties in the United States:

 DeWitt County, Illinois 
 DeWitt County, Texas